The Annihilators, also known just as Annihilators, is a 1985 American action film directed by Charles E. Sellier Jr. and starring  Jim Antonio, Sid Conrad and Gerrit Graham.

Cast 

 Jim Antonio as  Lt. Hawkins 
 Sid Conrad as Louie Nace
 Gerrit Graham as Ray Track
 Lawrence Hilton-Jacobs as Garrett Floyd
 Paul Koslo as Roy Boy Jagger
  Dennis Redfield  as Joe Nace
 Christopher Stone as Bill
  Andy Wood  as Woody
  Bruce Evers  as Jesse
  Millie Fisher  as Marie
  Tom Harper as Doc

References

External links 

1985 action films
1985 films
American action films
Films directed by Charles Sellier
New World Pictures films
1980s English-language films
1980s American films